= St. Matthew's Baptist Church (Harlem) =

St. Matthew’s Baptist Church of Harlem
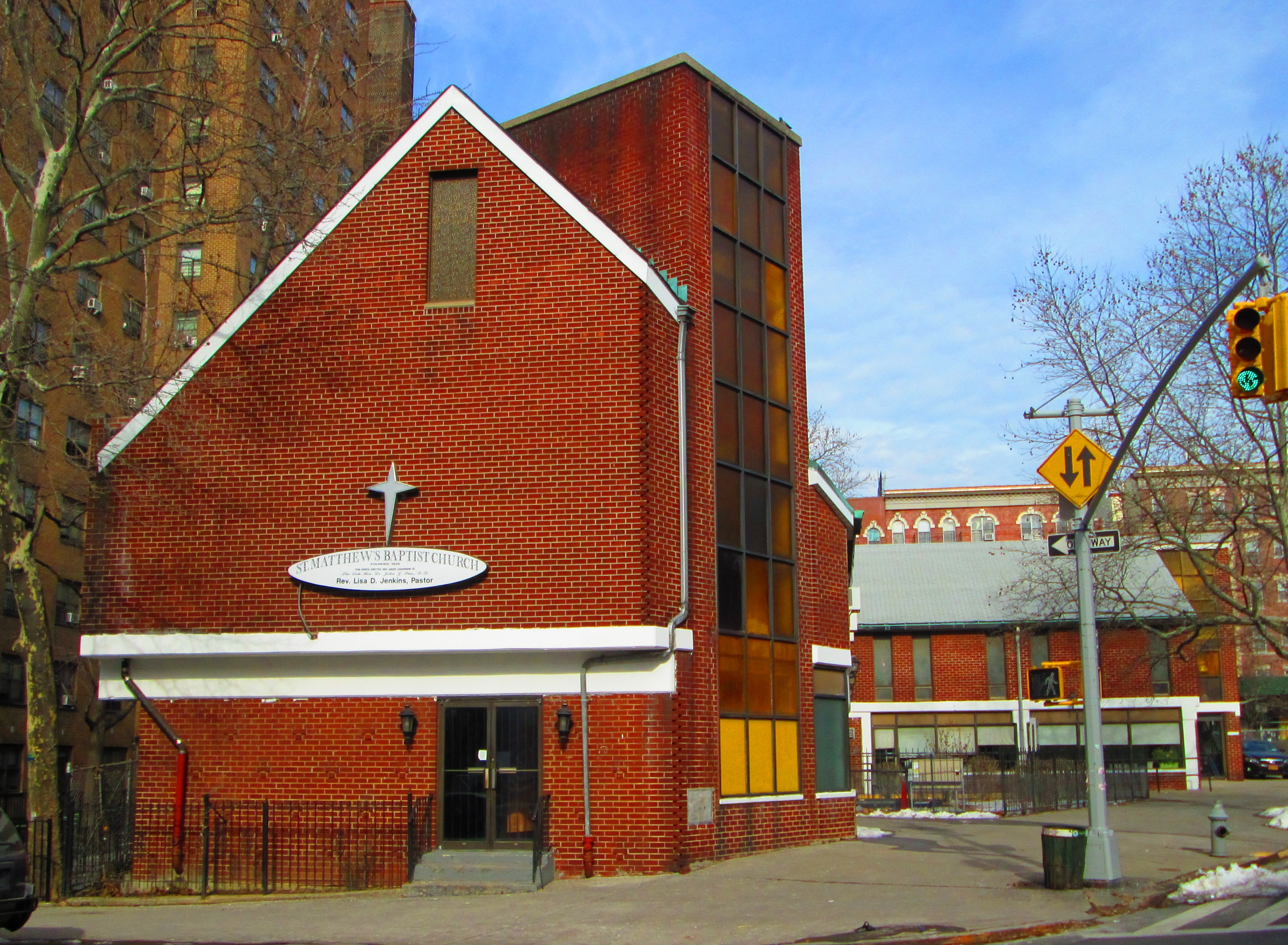
- The church in 2014
- St. Matthew’s Baptist Church of Harlem
- 40°49′36″N 73°56′18″W
- Location: 43 Rev. Dr. John J. Sass Place, Harlem, New York City
- Country: United States
- Denomination: Baptist
- Website: https://www.smbcharlem.org

History
- Founded: 1925
- Founder: Rev. Jerome Harris

St. Matthew’s Baptist Church of Harlem is a historic Baptist congregation in the Harlem neighborhood of New York City. The church was established in Harlem in 1925 and has served the community for a century as a religious and civic institution.

== History ==
=== Founding and early pastoral leadership (1925-1946) ===
According to Cynthia Hickman's historical project, "Harlem Churches At The End of the 21st Century," St. Matthew’s Baptist Church was established in Harlem in 1925.

=== Early locations ===
Hickman documents that the congregation worshipped at several Harlem locations during its early decades, including 270 West 153rd Street and later 2777 Eighth Avenue, before relocating to Macombs Place.

Hickman further notes that the church’s present site on Macombs Place was previously an industrial property, describing it as “the site of a former ice plant.”

The new building was designed to seat approximately 600 worshippers and included educational, administrative, and fellowship facilities. Hickman records that the congregation broke ground at Macombs Place in 1962 and constructed a new sanctuary at a cost exceeding $250,000 in order to accommodate a growing membership.

The congregation entered the newly constructed sanctuary on July 21, 1967.

Rev. Dr. John J. Sass served as pastor for fifty-four years, retiring on August 20, 2000. He was later designated Pastor Emeritus and died on March 11, 2001.

His long tenure coincided with major periods of demographic change, disinvestment, and later reinvestment in Harlem, during which he emerged as a prominent religious and civic figure in the Bradhurst and Upper Manhattan communities. Historian Cynthia Hickman notes that a housing development located directly across from the church at 267 West 152nd Street was named in his honor.

==== The Rev. Dr. John J. Sass Plaza ====
The Rev. Dr. John J. Sass Plaza housing development was part of a broader wave of neighborhood revitalization efforts in the early 1990s. A 1992 New York Times article on the redevelopment of Bradhurst highlighted the project as an example of renewed public and private investment in West Harlem, situating the Sass Plaza within wider efforts to stabilize housing and community institutions in the area.

Additional biographical and historical materials related to Sass’s ministry and civic work are preserved by the Rev. Dr. John J. Sass Revitalization & Scholarship Foundation, an organization established in his honor.

=== Rev. Dr. Lisa Jenkins Brown (2013-2025) ===
In 2013, the congregation elected Lisa Jenkins Brown as pastor. Her election received independent coverage in the New York Daily News, which reported on the historic appointment of the church’s first woman pastor.

On December 28, 2025, Rev. Brown delivered her final sermon at St. Matthew’s Baptist Church of Harlem, marking her retirement from pastoral leadership. The announcement was made during the church’s Sunday worship service.

=== Community outreach and public health involvement ===
St. Matthew’s Baptist Church was listed by the New York State Department of Health as a participating faith-based organization in HIV/AIDS education and community support initiatives. The church appears in a statewide resource directory documenting faith communities engaged in public health outreach related to HIV/AIDS prevention and awareness.

== Location ==
St. Matthew’s Baptist Church is located at 43 Rev. Dr. John J. Sass Place (formerly Macombs Place) in Harlem, New York City.
